The men's 100 metres at the 2021 World Athletics U20 Championships was held at the Kasarani Stadium on 18 and 19 August.

Records

Results

Heats
Qualification: First 3 of each heat (Q) and the 6 fastest times (q) qualified for the semifinal.

Wind:Heat 1: +0.8 m/s, Heat 2: -1.4 m/s, Heat 3: +0.7 m/s, Heat 4: +1.0 m/s, Heat 5: 0.0 m/s, Heat 6: -0.7 m/s

Semifinals
Qualification: First 2 of each heat (Q) and the 2 fastest times (q) qualified for the final.

Wind:Heat 1: +0.5 m/s, Heat 2: +0.4 m/s, Heat 3: +0.8 m/s

Final
The final was held on 19 August at 18:27.

Wind: -0.2 m/s

References

100 metres
100 metres at the World Athletics U20 Championships